Events from the year 1996 in Taiwan, Republic of China. This year is numbered Minguo 85 according to the official Republic of China calendar.

Incumbents
 President – Lee Teng-hui
 Vice President – Li Yuan-tsu, Lien Chan
 Premier – Lien Chan
 Vice Premier – Hsu Li-teh

Events

January
 1 January – The inauguration of the new Penghu Great Bridge in Penghu County.
 15 January – The restoration of Fujian Provincial Government from Xindian City, Taipei County to Jincheng Township, Kinmen County.
 22 January – The renaming of Training Center for Government Officials to Civil Service Development Institute.

March
 21 March – The renaming of Chieh-shou Road to Ketagalan Boulevard by Taipei Mayor Chen Shui-bian.
 23 March
 The end of Third Taiwan Strait Crisis.
 1996 Republic of China National Assembly election.
 1996 Republic of China presidential election.
 27 March – The establishment of Formosa Television.
 28 March – The opening of Wenshan Line of Taipei Metro.

April
 19 April – The establishment of Chiahui Power Corporation.

May
 5 May – The establishment of Tong-Kwang Light House Presbyterian Church in Taipei.

July
 4 July – Construction groundbreaking for Xinzhuang Baseball Stadium in Xinzhuang City, Taipei County.

November
 7 November – The opening of Taipei Astronomical Museum in Shilin District, Taipei City.

December
 1 December – The establishment of the Council of Aboriginal Affairs.
 15 December – The opening of the Representative Office in Taipei for the Moscow-Taipei Coordination Commission on Economic and Cultural Cooperation in Taipei.

Births
 24 February – Lin Wan-ting, taekwondo athlete
 19 August – Hsu Ching-wen, tennis player
 21 December – Ma Chia-ling, singer

Deaths
 13 March – Hsu Ching-chung, former Vice Premier of the Republic of China.
 16 October – Huang Shao-ku, former Vice Premier of the Republic of China.

References

 
Years of the 20th century in Taiwan
1990s in Taiwan
Taiwan
Taiwan